The list of ship launches in 1960 includes a chronological list of all ships launched in 1960.


References

1960
Ship launches